Line 6 of the Guangzhou Metro runs from Liwan District to Huangpu District. Line 6 serves densely populated areas including residential communities in Jinshazhou, the pedestrian street in Beijing Lu and wholesale markets in Shahe. Nevertheless, Line 6, which runs four-car trains, has long had a questionable train capacity. Like Lines 4 and 5, Line 6 is equipped with linear induction motor technology. Line 6's color is maroon.

Opening timeline

Station listing
 OSI - Out-of-station interchange (only available for IC cards users)

Overcrowding 

Such projections were in line with ridership of the, at the time, underutilized Lines 1 and 2 prior to 2004. Additionally, the national policy for subway construction at the time was to design for lines to operate shorter but more frequent trains, a policy dubbed "small groups, high density". The Type A designs used in Lines 1 and 2 were abandoned in favor of smaller Type B and L trains. After the newly opened Line 3 with its Type B trains quickly experienced severe overcrowding by 2006, there was large public attention paid to under construction lines following this low design capacity paradigm, particularly on Lines 5 and 6. However, the construction of Line 6 was well underway using the original light metro plan of four car Type L trains, which are even lower in capacity than the trains used in Line 3. A change to longer trains on Line 6 had become unfeasible as it would require modification to stations structures whose construction had been completed. An internal report of Guangzhou Metro also released in 2009 reckoned that using the same six car B-type rolling stock as Line 3 would increase the capacity of Line 6 by 50%. Land expropriation and residence relocation would pose even greater challenges to station expansion as evidenced by severe delays in the construction of the stations of Yide Lu and Shahe. In 2014, one year after opening, daily ridership on Line 6 has grown to 600,000 and continues to increase steadily, peaking at 858,000 passengers on 16 September 2016, a mere two years later. With the opening of Phase II extending the line from Changban to Xiangxue in late 2016 ridership continues to increase, averaging 850,000 passengers per day as of April 2018. Since 2017, daily ridership of Line 6 consistently peaks over 1 million passengers per day during high load periods such as holidays.

Guangzhou Metro has responded to the crowding by decreasing headways and buying supplementary rolling stock to further increase frequencies. All Line 6 trains had several rows of seats removed to allow for more standees and increase overall capacity. Phase II stations east of Botanical Garden Station were redesigned before stating construction to allow for at least 6 car Type L trains to be used. There are various plans to separate this section of Line 6 to be an independent line, allowing for the use of 6 car trains and diverting passenger traffic away from the central Phase I section Line 6.

Future Expansion 
The Third Phase of Line 6 was originally planned to further extend the line east deeper into Zengcheng, terminating at Guanhu station and connect with the Zengcheng Development Zone Station on the Xinbaiguang intercity railway. However in 2018, this plan was abandoned and Phase III east extension of Line 6 was folded permanently as the eastern section of Line 23 with the western section of Line 23 will no longer using any Phase II trackage of Line 6, instead heading southwest to Chishajiao Station in Haizhu District.> Line 6 Phase III will instead be a short  two station extension to Liucun.

In 2019, another proposal to spin off the eastern section of Line 6 east of Botanical Garden Station. This time the new line will take over the eastern section beyond Botanical Garden Station and head south to Canton Tower station. This new line is tentatively named Line 20.

Rolling Stock 

As of September 2021, Line 6 is served by 89 sets of four car linear motor trains.

References

06
Linear motor metros
Railway lines opened in 2013
1500 V DC railway electrification